Julien Jean-Marc Gilbert Gobaux (born 11 December 1990) is a French male artistic gymnast and a member of the national team. He participated at the 2014 World Artistic Gymnastics Championships in Nanjing, China, and qualified for the 2016 Summer Olympics.

References

External links
 

1990 births
Living people
Monegasque male artistic gymnasts
French male artistic gymnasts
People from Soissons
Gymnasts at the 2016 Summer Olympics
Olympic gymnasts of France
Mediterranean Games silver medalists for France
Mediterranean Games bronze medalists for France
Competitors at the 2018 Mediterranean Games
Mediterranean Games medalists in gymnastics
European Games competitors for France
Gymnasts at the 2015 European Games
Sportspeople from Aisne